Shihu Yeguang Wan is a brownish-black pill used in Traditional Chinese medicine to "replenish yin of the kidney, quench liver-fire and improve eyesight". It tastes sweet and slightly bitter. It is used where there is "deficiency of yin of the liver and the kidney with rousing of fire causing cataract with impaired vision".

Chinese classic herbal formula

See also
 Chinese classic herbal formula
 Bu Zhong Yi Qi Wan

References

Traditional Chinese medicine pills